Beuren is a municipality in the district of Esslingen in Baden-Württemberg in southern Germany. It is a spa and resort. With the majority of its district (95.2%), Beuren is  part of the Swabian Alb biosphere reserve.

Geography
Beuren is located 28 km southeast of Stuttgart and 16 km southwest of Reutlingen.

Politics

Mayors since 1853 
 1853–1879: Nicolaus Klaß
 1879–1888: Jacob Klaß
 1888–1890: Philipp Friedrich Nestel
 1890–1927: Wilhelm Eugen Schraft
 1927–1934: Karl Friedrich Schminke
 1934: Wilhelm König 
 1934–1945: Wilhelm Spanagel
 1945–1946: August Reuß 
 1946–1948: Helmut Link
 1948–1983: Willi Gras
 1983–2015: Erich Hartmann
 since 2016: Daniel Gluiber

Municipal council 
The result of the local government elections on May 25, 2014:

Notable people
 August Pfänder (1891–1971), mayor in Neuffen and Nürtingen
 Gottlob Espenlaub (1900–1972), born in Balzholz, German pilot and plane-constructor
 Karl Albert Pfänder (1906–1990), wooden sculptor and wood turner, designer for wood products
 Wolfgang Ischinger (born 1946), German jurist, former diplomat, leader of Munich Security Conference since 2008

References

Esslingen (district)
Württemberg